Marisa Isabel Lopes Mena, better known by the stage name Mimicat, is a Portuguese pop and soul singer and composer. She is set to represent Portugal in the Eurovision Song Contest 2023.

She participated in Festival da Canção 2001 with the song "Mundo Colorido" under the stage name Izamena, but did not advance beyond the semifinals. She participated in Festival da Canção 2023, the Portuguese national selection for Eurovision 2023 with the song "Ai coração". She performed it in the first semi-final and qualified to the final. In the final of the competition, she finished in first place, thus set to represent Portugal in the Eurovision Song Contest 2023.

Discography

Albums

Singles

References 

Living people
Portuguese pop singers
21st-century Portuguese women singers
English-language singers from Portugal
Portuguese women singer-songwriters
People from Coimbra
Eurovision Song Contest entrants of 2023
Eurovision Song Contest entrants for Portugal